William Alexander O'Hara (1883-1931) was a Major League Baseball outfielder. He started his professional baseball career in 1902 and played for the Baltimore Orioles from 1905 to 1908. He then played in the National League for the New York Giants and St. Louis Cardinals before finishing his career with the Toronto Maple Leafs.

References

1883 births
1931 deaths
Canadian expatriate baseball players in the United States
Major League Baseball outfielders
Major League Baseball players from Canada
Canadian baseball players
Canadian sportspeople of Irish descent
New York Giants (NL) players
St. Louis Cardinals players
Minor league baseball managers
Montreal Royals players
Syracuse Stars (minor league baseball) players
Oakland Oaks (baseball) players
Seattle Siwashes players
Toledo Mud Hens players
Baltimore Orioles (IL) players
Wilkes-Barre Barons (baseball) players
Toronto Maple Leafs (International League) players